Ganzurino is a rural locality (a selo) in Ivolginsky District, Republic of Buryatia, Russia. The population was 429 as of 2010. There are 4 streets.

Geography 
Ganzurino is located 46 km south of Ivolginsk (the district's administrative centre) by road. Zun-Orongoy is the nearest rural locality.

References 

Rural localities in Ivolginsky District